Ito Airport  is an airport serving Ito, Democratic Republic of the Congo.

References

Airports in Kwilu Province